Maryland Route 330 (MD 330) is a state highway in the U.S. state of Maryland. Known as Maryland Line Road, the highway runs  from MD 299 and MD 313 at Massey east to the Delaware state line in eastern Kent County, where the highway continues as Clayton Delaney Road. Maryland Line Road was improved in 1954 but was not brought into the state highway system and designated MD 330 until the late 1980s.

Route description

MD 330 begins at a four-way intersection with MD 299 and MD 313 at Massey. MD 299 heads north as Massey Road toward Sassafras, and MD 313 heads west (northbound) and south as Galena Road. MD 330 heads east as a two-lane undivided road that immediately has a grade crossing of the Centreville Branch of the Northern Line of the Maryland and Delaware Railroad just south of the junction of the Centreville and Chestertown branches of the Northern Line. The highway passes north of the Massey Aerodrome and Massey Air Museum before it runs through Millington Wildlife Management Area. MD 330 crosses Black Bottom Branch before it reaches its eastern terminus at the Delaware state line, where the road continues east as Clayton Delaney Road in the southwest corner of New Castle County.

History
The Maryland State Roads Commission reconstructed Maryland Line Road as a gravel road from the railroad crossing to the state line in 1954; however, they decided to leave the highway in the county highway system. The whole length of the highway was brought into the state highway system through a December 1, 1987, road transfer agreement. The highway was designated MD 330 in July 1988.

Junction list

See also

References

External links

MDRoads: MD 330

330
Maryland Route 330